Apps is a surname. Notable people with the surname include:

Apps family, a Canadian dynasty of ice hockey players:
Syl Apps (1915–1988), also a pole vaulter and former Ontario Cabinet Minister 
Syl Apps Jr. (born 1947), son of Syl Apps
Syl Apps III (born 1976), son of Syl Apps Jr.
Gillian Apps (born 1983), daughter of Syl Apps Jr.
Alfred Apps, (born 1957) Canadian lawyer and former President of the Liberal Party of Canada 
Olivia Apps (born 1998), daughter of Alfred Apps and Canadian Women's 7s rugby player
Deon Apps (born 1987), Australian rugby league player
Geoff Apps (born 1949), English mountain bike pioneer
Roy Apps (born 1951), British screenwriter, dramatist and children's author

See also
App (surname)